Maria do Carmo Seabra (born 27 January 1955) is a Portuguese politician.

Born in Lisbon, she served as Minister of Education in the 2004–2005 government of fellow Social Democrat Pedro Santana Lopes. 

She is currently a lecturer of Principles of Microeconomics at Nova School of Business and Economics.

External links
  Portuguese Government biography

Living people
1955 births
Social Democratic Party (Portugal) politicians
Education ministers of Portugal
Seabra, Maria Carmo